The 2008–09 Marist Red Foxes women's basketball team represented Marist College during the 2008–09 NCAA Division I women's basketball season. The Red Foxes, led by seventh year head coach Brian Giorgis, play their home games at the McCann Center and were members of the Metro Atlantic Athletic Conference. They finished the season 29–4, 16–2 in MAAC play to finish in first place and win the MAAC regular season title for the sixth consecutive time. In the MAAC women's basketball tournament, they defeated #9 seed Loyola (MD) in the quarterfinals, #5 seed Iona in the semifinals, and #2 seed Canisius in the championship game to earn the conference's automatic bid to the NCAA women's tournament. It was their fourth consecutive MAAC Tournament championship. As a #12 seed, they were defeated by #5 seed Virginia 61–68 in the First Round.

Roster

Schedule

|-
!colspan=9 style=|Regular Season

|-
!colspan=9 style=| MAAC Women's Tournament

|-
!colspan=9 style=| NCAA tournament

References

Marist Red Foxes women's basketball seasons
Marist
2009 NCAA Division I women's basketball tournament participants